Patricia Schonstein (born 1952), who also writes under the name Patricia Schonstein-Pinnock, is a South African-Italian novelist, poet, memoirist, author of children’s books and curator of anthologies. Schonstein, whose novels variously employ the genres of magical-realism, meta-fiction and narrative fiction, is famous for novels such as Skyline and A Time of Angels.

Schonstein's novels draw heavily on her personal experiences of growing up in Central Africa and to historical events related to the Inquisition, the Holocaust, the Rhodesian War, and apartheid. She pays homage to the child-victims of war in Africa and to refugees, weaving together harsh realities with elements of myth and magic.

Her work has been translated into Afrikaans, Dutch, French, German, Italian, Norwegian, Spanish and Swedish.

Life
Born and raised in Southern Rhodesia (now Zimbabwe), Schonstein lives in South Africa where she works as a full-time author.

Literary career 
Schonstein holds a master's degree in creative writing from the University of Cape Town, supervised by 2003 Nobel Literature Laureate J. M. Coetzee, who has endorsed much of her work. Her poetry has been endorsed by 1984 Nobel Peace Laureate Archbishop Desmond Tutu.

Schonstein serves on the Poetry in McGregor committee and presents the annual Patricia Schonstein – Poetry in McGregor Award. 

She has been an honorary member of Southern African Friendship and Aid Network Sweden (SAFRAN) since 2008, and served as deputy editor of the poetry quarterly, Stanzas (2015-2020).

Awards 
 Her debut novel, Skyline, won the French Prix du Marais in 2005; won the Percy FitzPatrick Award in 2002; took second place in the South African Sunday Times Fiction Award in 2001; was long-listed for the 2002 International Dublin Literary Award; was listed in the South African Twenty-Five Must-Reads in 2007; and was listed in the Swedish En Bok for alle.
 A Time of Angels took second place in the South African Sunday Times Fiction Award in 2004; and was short-listed for the 2004 Booksellers’ Choice Award.
 The Apothecary’s Daughter was listed in the Sunday Times Read Your Way Through Democracy in 2014.
 Banquet at Brabazan was short-listed for the Commonwealth Writer’s Prize Africa Best Book in 2011.
 Schonstein was the winner of the 1997 Young Africa Award (Short Stories Category).

Works

Novels 
 Skyline, 2000
 A Time of Angels, 2003
 The Apothecary's Daughter, 2004
 A Quilt of Dreams, 2006
 The Master's Ruse, 2008
 Banquet at Brabazan, 2010
The Inn at Helsvlakte, 2020

For children 
 The Phoebe Book of Poems for Children, 2022
 Sing, Africa! Poems and Song for Young Children, 1990
 Thobileʼs dream, 1991
 Thobile and the Tortoises, 1992
 The King Who Loved Birds, 1992
 Maggie, Mango & Scottie – An Adventure in Africa, 2016
 Ouma's Autumn, 1993
 Saturday in Africa : Living History Through Poetry, 1996

Poetry 
 The Unknown Child: Poems of War, Loss and Longing, 2009
 A Gathering of Madonnas, and Other Poems, 2001

Non-fiction 
 Xhosa: a Cultural Grammar for Beginners, 1994
Thrown Among the Bones—My Life in Fiction, 2022

Curated anthologies 
Africa! My Africa! An Anthology of Poems, 2012
Africa Ablaze! Poems & Prose Pieces of War & Civil Conflict, 2013
Heart of Africa! Poems of Love, Loss and Longing, 2014
Absolute Africa! An anthology of poems, 2018
Naturally Africa! An anthology of earth poems, 2019 (Selected with Dan Wylie)
 McGregor Poetry Festival 2013 Anthology
 McGregor Poetry Festival 2014 Anthology
 McGregor Poetry Festival 2015 Anthology
 McGregor Poetry Festival 2016 Anthology
McGregor Poetry Festival 2017 Anthology
McGregor Poetry Festival 2018 Anthology
McGregor Poetry Festival 2019 Anthology
McGregor Poetry Festival 2020 Anthology: Love in the Time of Covid
McGregor Poetry Festival 2021 Anthology: The Garden of the Beloved

Appearances in anthologies 
 Lovely Beyond Any Singing: Landscape in South African Literature, compiled by Helen Moffett, Double Storey Books, 2006
 Nice Times! A Book of South African Pleasures and Delights, compiled by Henrietta  Rose-Innes, Double Storey Books, 2006
 Land i förändring: en bok om det nya Sydafrika, edited by Annika Forsberg et al, Bokförlaget Tranan, 2004
 Keys, compiled by Brenda Cooper, Maskew Miller Longman (Pty) Ltd, 1998

Further reading
 Heather Acott, 'Dark Humor: Satire, the Baroque, and the Carnivalesque in Patricia Schonstein’s Banquet at Brabazan and Ingrid Winterbach’s The Elusive Moth', Kritika Kultura 18 (2012): 134-48
 Michael Chapman and Margaret Lenta (Ed.) SA Lit and beyond 2000 Representing the African Diaspora J.U. Jacobs 315-332

References



1952 births
Living people
White Rhodesian people
South African people of German descent
South African children's writers
South African women poets
Rhodesian novelists
Zimbabwean emigrants to South Africa
University of Cape Town alumni
South African women novelists
South African women children's writers
20th-century Zimbabwean writers
20th-century Zimbabwean women writers
21st-century Zimbabwean writers
21st-century Zimbabwean women writers
21st-century South African writers
21st-century South African women writers
White South African people
Rhodesian emigrants to South Africa